Evelīna Barone (born 16 November 2003 in Riga) is a Latvian curler from Riga. She is currently the lead of the Latvian National Women's Curling Team and is the skip of the Latvian National Junior Women's Team.

Career
At the national level, she is a two-time Latvian women's champion (2016, 2019) and six-time junior champion (2014, 2015, 2016, 2017, 2018, 2019). When she was just 13, she competed in her first European Curling Championships at the 2016 European Curling Championships where the team finished sixth in the B Group with a 5–4 record. The teams best finish was in 2018 where they finished 4–5 in the A Division including defeating higher-ranked Scotland's Eve Muirhead. This qualified them for the 2019 World Women's Curling Championship. There, the team struggled, finishing in last place with a 1–11 record.

Teams

References

External links
 
 
 Video: 

Living people
2003 births
Sportspeople from Riga
Latvian female curlers
Latvian curling champions
Latvian people of Italian descent